VOEA Lomipeau (A301) (ex Punaruu, ex Bow Cecil) is a coastal tanker in service with the Tonga Maritime Force since 1995. The ship was built in 1969 in Norway and commissioned into the French Navy as the Punaruu on 16 November 1971. It was gifted to Tonga in 1995 as a reward for not speaking out against French nuclear testing. It was subsequently given a major refit in Auckland, New Zealand, then used to carry relief fuel to the Cook Islands, and water to Haʻapai.

Its home port is Nukuʻalofa.

References

Naval ships of Tonga
1969 ships